Moments of Clarity is the third EP by American progressive metalcore band Erra. It was released on November 10, 2014 through Sumerian Records and was produced by Brian Hood. It is their only album with vocalist Ian Eubanks, the first with Sean Price as a guitarist (after having played bass on Augment), and their first release to be published by Sumerian Records.

Track listing

Personnel
Erra
 Ian Eubanks – unclean vocals
 Jesse Cash – guitar, bass, clean vocals, backing unclean vocals
 Sean Price – guitar, bass
 Alex Ballew – drums

Additional personnel
 Brian Hood – production, engineering

Charts

References

2014 EPs
Erra (band) albums
Sumerian Records albums